Bukom Boxing Arena is the first boxing arena to be built in Ghana. The multipurpose facility was commissioned by John Dramani Mahama in  November 2016 and has a seating capacity of 4000. Other facilities in the open-air edifice include a sports hall, Aerobic centre, Olympic size swimming pool and conference hall. The arena was constructed in Bukom due to the numerous world boxing champions the community has produced. Apart from boxing, the arena hosts basketball tournaments. The arena is adorned with the names of Ghanaian world boxing champions and otherwise famous Ghanaian boxers, such as Azumah Nelson, Ike Quartey, D.K. Poison and others.

Funding 
The arena was funded by Social Security and National Insurance Trust (SSNIT) in partnership with a  Polish company, ETC Group Polska in their joint venture company Trust Sports Emporium Limited.

Crime scene 
In October 2018 the arena was declared a crime scene after fans reacted violently to referee Adorn Bertin's decision to end a bout between Isaac Sackey and Wasiru Mohammed. Bertin called a halt to the contest after defending WBO Africa super-bantamweight champion Sackey was knocked down by Mohammed in the third round. Although Sackey was able to return to his feet, Bertin waved off the fight, awarding Mohammed the WBO title via knockout.

External links

References 

Sport in Accra
Sports venues in Ghana